Scybalicus is a genus of beetles in the family Carabidae, containing the following species:

 Scybalicus biroi Jedlicka, 1952
 Scybalicus kabylianus Reiche, 1862
 Scybalicus minoricensis J. Vives & E. Vives, 1994
 Scybalicus oblongisculus (Dejean, 1829)

References

Harpalinae